Pescadores Mall is a shopping center in Magong City, Penghu County, Taiwan that opened on 3 January 2013. The mall is located in close proximity to Penghu Airport. The mall is a part of a development complex that includes the Pescadores Resort, a duty-free shop and a mall. The main core stores of the mall include PX Mart, international boutiques, perfume and cosmetics and other duty-free shops and brands.

See also
 List of tourist attractions in Taiwan

References

External links

2013 establishments in Taiwan
Shopping malls established in 2013
Shopping malls in Magong